The Green Bay Packers are a professional American football team based in Green Bay, Wisconsin.  They are members of the North Division of the National Football Conference (NFC) and are the third-oldest franchise in the National Football League (NFL).  The club was founded in 1919 by coach, player, and future Hall of Fame inductee Curly Lambeau and sports and telegraph editor George Whitney Calhoun.  The Packers competed against local teams for two seasons before entering the NFL in 1921.

The Packers have had 46 starting quarterbacks (QB) in the history of their franchise.  The Packers' past starting quarterbacks include Pro Football Hall of Fame inductees Curly Lambeau, Tony Canadeo, Arnie Herber, Bart Starr and Brett Favre.  The team's first starting quarterback was Norm Barry, while the longest serving and current for the  season is Aaron Rodgers, who is playing in his 18th season in the NFL. They are listed in order of the date of each player's first start at quarterback for the Packers.

Regular season

Postseason

Team Career Passing Records 
Through week 18 of the 2022 NFL Season

References

Green Bay Packers

quarterbacks